William das Graças Silva Júnior, better known as William Amendoim (born May 6, 1987, in São Gonçalo, Rio de Janeiro), is a Brazilian footballer who plays as an attacking midfielder.

Career

William Amendoim is a talented midfielder brought up in the youth ranks of Flamengo, in one of the club's most successful generations of young players. He signed a 3-year professional contract in 2005. In April 2006 he signed a new 5-year deal. In May 2007 he added 0 more months to his contract to December 31, 2011.

William Amendoim was a member of the generation of players born in 1987–89 to win numerous youth competitions with the Flamengo jersey. Amendoim his youth and senior honors are three titles of the Campeonato Carioca de Juniores Rio de Janeiro, the Copa Belo Horizonte de Juniores, the Copa OPG, the Copa Record and the Copa Cultura, all achieved with Flamengo. However, William Amendoim has played few matches as a senior for Flamengo, coming up once as a substitute in a 2006 Brazilian Série A match against São Caetano, won by Flamengo 4–1. When he looked set to establish himself among the club professionals in early 2007, after a distinguished performance in that year's Rio de Janeiro Campeonato Carioca de Juniores, William Amendoim suffered a serious knee injury that left him sidelined for six months.

In 2008, the young playmaker was loaned to Macaé to play in the senior Rio state championship that year. Due to problems with his contract, however, William ended up not playing for Macaé at all. He was eventually loaned out to Madureira, in time to enroll in the Brazilian Série C competition in July 2008. Still in 2008, he signed another loan contract, with Bonsucesso, where he stayed until the end of the year.

After the series of unsuccessful experiences, Amendoim was loaned out to the Minas Gerais side Social in early 2009, and later that year to Tombense. In 2010, William Amendoim returned to Rio de Janeiro, signing up a loan contract with Americano to compete in the Campeonato Carioca. He was again loaned out in 2010, to CFZ, the club founded by Flamengo greatest legend and then executive director, Zico.

His stay with CFZ was short and in 2010 William returned to Flamengo. He took part in the Campeonato Brasileiro U-23 with the club, hoping to win a chance in the first team.

In January 2011 he left for Ipatinga Futebol Clube on loan.

Career statistics
(Correct )

according to combined sources on the Flamengo official website and Flaestatística.

Honours
 Flamengo
Copa do Brasil: 2006
Taça Guanabara: 2007
Campeonato Carioca: 2007

References

External links
ogol
CBF Registry

Living people
1987 births
People from São Gonçalo, Rio de Janeiro
Brazilian footballers
Campeonato Brasileiro Série A players
Campeonato Brasileiro Série C players
CR Flamengo footballers
Macaé Esporte Futebol Clube players
Madureira Esporte Clube players
Bonsucesso Futebol Clube players
Tombense Futebol Clube players
Americano Futebol Clube players
Centro de Futebol Zico players
Ipatinga Futebol Clube players
Clube Recreativo e Atlético Catalano players
Anápolis Futebol Clube players
Associação Atlética Portuguesa (RJ) players
Olaria Atlético Clube players
Estrela do Norte Futebol Clube players
Association football midfielders
Sportspeople from Rio de Janeiro (state)